Antera Duke (alive as late as 1788) was a leading African slave dealer and Efik chief from Old Calabar in the Bight of Biafra in eastern Nigeria (now in Cross River State) during the late eighteenth century. He gradually prospered and was member of the local Ekpe society that had a great amount of power over slave trade. He arranged funerals, which for men of standing like himself included the ritual sacrifice of slaves, who were decapitated to accompany the master into the spirit world. Duke and his fellow Efik traders "dressed as white men" and entertained captains of Slave ships.

His diary, written in Nigerian Pidgin English, was discovered in Scotland and published. This diary records his interactions with British merchants to whom he sold slaves; he writes about wearing "white man trousers" and entertaining the merchants he traded with.

In addition to trading slaves, Duke sometimes caught the slaves himself. According to his diary, once he settled an old score with a Bakassi merchant by capturing him and his two slaves and personally delivering them aboard a slave ship. During the three years he kept his diary (1785-88), he noted the departure of twenty vessels (all from Liverpool) he had helped to "slave".

A new edition of his diary, edited by Stephen D. Behrendt, A. J. H. Latham, and David Northrup, was published by Oxford University Press in 2010.

References

Further reading
C. Daryll Forde (ed.), Efik Traders of Old Calabar (London: Dawsons of Pall Mall for the International African Institute, 1968) (contains Duke's diary)

18th-century African businesspeople
African slave traders
People from Calabar
People of Efik descent
18th-century Nigerian people
18th-century diarists